The 1924 International cricket season was from April 1924 to August 1924.

Season overview

May

Test trial in England

June

South Africa in England

July

Ireland in Scotland

August

Shropshire in Netherlands

Foresters in Netherlands

Scotland in Wales

References

1924 in cricket